Claire Tiltman was a 16-year-old girl who was murdered on 18 January 1993 in Greenhithe, Kent, England. Her murder was not solved until 21 years later.
	

On 12 December 2014, Colin Ash-Smith was sentenced to life imprisonment with a minimum of 21 years for her murder. He was already 18 years into a life sentence for two other non-fatal stabbings.

Murder

Claire Tiltman, a Year 11 pupil at Dartford Grammar School for Girls, took a short cut down an alleyway on her way to meet a friend near her home in Greenhithe. Around 100 steps from a busy main road down an alleyway, she was stabbed 49 times in an apparently random attack. In February 2014, a man was charged with the murder. The Crown Prosecution Service (CPS) said it had sufficient evidence to prosecute 45-year-old Colin Ash-Smith.

Ash-Smith had been jailed for life in December 1996 for knife attacks in 1988 and 1995 on two women. He had admitted stabbing the young women, and leaving them for dead, although both survived.

While in Wakefield Prison, Ash-Smith told a fellow prisoner (Stefen Dubois, real name Molliere), about an attack on a zebra crossing and his “snapping” and stabbing her multiple times. The confession proved to be crucial to bringing him to justice for the murder of Claire Tiltman.

Conviction
On 12 December 2014, Colin Ash-Smith, then aged 46, was jailed for life for murdering Claire Tiltman. He had first been questioned about her murder in 1995, the same year that he committed the second of the two stabbings for which he was convicted in 1996. He was charged on the day he was due to be considered for release by the parole board, having served 18 years of a life sentence for the two previous attacks on women. He was told he would spend a minimum of 21 years behind bars by Mr Justice Sweeney. A number of Claire's school friends were in the gallery to hear the sentencing. Following his conviction, detectives branded Ash-Smith as 'pure evil' and said he should never be freed. Jaswant Narwal, CPS South East Chief Crown Prosecutor, called the case "one of the most complex cases" CPS South East has dealt with in recent years.

In the years following her death, Tiltman's parents Clifford and Lin made regular appeals to the media and public for information leading a conviction in the years following her murder. However, they both died before Ash-Smith was charged and convicted. Her mother died in March 2008 at the age of 56, and her father died in September 2012 at the age of 63, both from cancer. They had no other children. Roger Tiltman, the brother of Clifford, said that his brother and sister-in-law were racked with guilt at her killing and the stress of it drove them both to early graves. In a victim impact statement, her uncle said: "The fact they allowed her out on the night of her death caused them a massive amount of pain.”

Ash-Smith was already a known violent offender, and was first identified as a suspect in the murder of Claire Tiltman almost 20 years before he was finally convicted. In December 1988, he had tried to rape and murder a young mother in a quarry. In October 1995, he stabbed 22-year-old Charlotte Barnard 14 times, close to where he had killed Claire nearly three years earlier. He denied attacking Claire, and had attended his victim's funeral a month after the killing with his Labour councillor parents, wearing the same beige jacket he had worn on the night of the murder.

Colin Ash-Smith
Colin Ash-Smith (born 1968) was the only child of Aubrey and Diane Ash-Smith,. He was aged 24 at the time of Tiltman's murder, and working locally as a milkman, and still lived with his parents at their home in Swanscombe. According to the CPS, Ash-Smith developed a pattern after the murder and set up false alibis on four occasions as well as increasing the ferocity and severity in his attacks. He is currently imprisoned at HMP Durham.

His mother, Diane, was a former Labour Party councillor and later mayor. She told police that he had been driving her home at the time of the attack on Claire.  In 1997 she said neither she, her husband, or son had had anything to do with Claire's killing.

His father Aubrey, who died in May 2016, had also served as a Labour Party councillor, but was jailed for 12 months in 1997 for perverting the course of justice. He had destroyed a knife just before the family home was due to be searched by police. He had admitted he boiled, dismantled and threw away a knife to destroy evidence. Colin was denied a Special Purpose Licence to attend his father's funeral after news that he could potentially be allowed a temporary release to do so was met with public outcry on social media. Instead he was allowed to send a floral tribute.

In November 2015, Ash-Smith launched an appeal against his conviction on the grounds that Mr Justice Sweeney had wrongly allowed "gravely prejudicial" material to go before the jury. However, it was rejected by Lord Justice Davis and two other Lords Justice of Appeal.

In popular culture
Ash-Smith's conviction was among the cases featured in the BBC Four three-part documentary The Prosecutors, which showcases the CPS's work and the legal procedures behind a prosecution. The documentary was commended by the Radio Times as well as one of Tiltman's school friends who had testified at Ash-Smith's trial.

In 2018, a documentary on Tiltman's case was released as part of Crime + Investigation's series Murdertown. The episode, the second episode of series one, was titled "Dartford".

References

External links
 Justice for Claire website

1993 in England
1993 murders in the United Kingdom
1990s in Kent
2010s trials
Deaths by person in England
Greenhithe
Incidents of violence against girls
January 1993 crimes
January 1993 events in the United Kingdom
Murder in Kent
Murder trials
Trials in England
Female murder victims